Eupithecia hesperina is a moth in the family Geometridae. It is found in south-western China (Yunnan).

The wingspan is about 16–17 mm. The fore- and hindwings are buff.

References

Moths described in 2004
hesperina
Moths of Asia